Kunchala Voravichitchaikul (born 14 November 1984) is an internationally elite badminton player from Thailand. She competed at the 2006, 2010 and 2014 Asian Games.

Kunchala Voravichitchaikul is a doubles specialist who is paired with Duanganong Aroonkesorn in women's doubles and Songphon Anugritayawon in mixed doubles. She is a veteran of one World Championship, the 2010 Paris Worlds where she failed to make the quarter-finals in both events. (She also entered the 2009 Hyderabad Worlds with Anugritayawon, but withdrew before competition began.) Her best tournament results so far are at the 2010 French Open where she won the women's doubles title with Aroonkesorn, and the 2009 Japan Open, where she and Anugritayawon won the mixed doubles title.

Achievements

Asian Championships 
Women's doubles

Southeast Asian Games 
Women's doubles

Mixed doubles

Summer Universiade 
Women's doubles

World Junior Championships 
Girls' doubles

Asian Junior Championships 
Girls' doubles

BWF Superseries 
The BWF Superseries, which was launched on 14 December 2006 and implemented in 2007, is a series of elite badminton tournaments, sanctioned by the Badminton World Federation (BWF). BWF Superseries levels are Superseries and Superseries Premier. A season of Superseries consists of twelve tournaments around the world that have been introduced since 2011. Successful players are invited to the Superseries Finals, which are held at the end of each year.

Women's doubles

Mixed doubles

  BWF Superseries Finals tournament
  BWF Superseries Premier tournament
  BWF Superseries tournament

BWF Grand Prix 
The BWF Grand Prix had two levels, the BWF Grand Prix and Grand Prix Gold. It was a series of badminton tournaments sanctioned by the Badminton World Federation (BWF) which was held from 2007 to 2017.

Women's doubles

Mixed doubles

  BWF Grand Prix Gold tournament
  BWF Grand Prix tournament

BWF International Challenge/Series 
Women's doubles

Mixed doubles

  BWF International Challenge tournament
  BWF International Series tournament

Record against selected opponents 
Mixed doubles results with Songphon Anugritayawon against Superseries Final finalists, World Championships semi-finalists, and Olympic quarterfinalists.

  He Hanbin & Yu Yang 0–3
  Tao Jiaming & Ma Jin 0–1
  Tao Jiaming & Tian Qing 0–1
  Xu Chen & Yu Yang 0–2
  Zhang Nan & Zhao Yunlei 1–0
  Zheng Bo & Gao Ling 0–1
  Zhang Jun & Gao Ling 1–1
  Xu Chen & Ma Jin 0–3
  Xie Zhongbo & Zhang Yawen 0–3
  Lee Sheng-mu & Chien Yu-chin 0–1
  Chen Hung-ling & Cheng Wen-hsing 0–3
  Joachim Fischer Nielsen & Christinna Pedersen 2–2
  Thomas Laybourn & Kamilla Rytter Juhl 0–2
  Lars Paaske & Mette Schjoldager 0–1
  Anthony Clark & Donna Kellogg 1–2
  Nathan Robertson & Jenny Wallwork 1–1
  Nathan Robertson & Gail Emms 0–1
 / Chris Adcock & Imogen Bankier 1–1
  Michael Fuchs & Birgit Michels 1–0
  Flandy Limpele & Vita Marissa 1–0
  Nova Widianto & Liliyana Natsir 0–5
 / Hendra Setiawan & Anastasia Russkikh 0–1
  Tontowi Ahmad & Liliyana Natsir 0–2
  Fran Kurniawan & Pia Zebadiah Bernadet 0–1
  Lee Yong-dae & Lee Hyo-jung 0–5
  Ko Sung-hyun & Ha Jung-eun 0–1
  Koo Kien Keat & Wong Pei Tty 0–1
  Chan Peng Soon & Goh Liu Ying 2–1
  Robert Mateusiak & Nadieżda Zięba 1–0
  Sudket Prapakamol & Saralee Thungthongkam 3–1

References

External links 

 

1984 births
Living people
Kunchala Voravichitchaikul
Kunchala Voravichitchaikul
Badminton players at the 2006 Asian Games
Badminton players at the 2010 Asian Games
Badminton players at the 2014 Asian Games
Kunchala Voravichitchaikul
Asian Games medalists in badminton
Medalists at the 2010 Asian Games
Competitors at the 2001 Southeast Asian Games
Competitors at the 2003 Southeast Asian Games
Competitors at the 2005 Southeast Asian Games
Competitors at the 2007 Southeast Asian Games
Competitors at the 2009 Southeast Asian Games
Competitors at the 2011 Southeast Asian Games
Competitors at the 2015 Southeast Asian Games
Kunchala Voravichitchaikul
Kunchala Voravichitchaikul
Kunchala Voravichitchaikul
Southeast Asian Games medalists in badminton
Kunchala Voravichitchaikul
Kunchala Voravichitchaikul
Universiade medalists in badminton
Medalists at the 2007 Summer Universiade
Kunchala Voravichitchaikul
Kunchala Voravichitchaikul